Jack Llewellyn Knight (May 29, 1917 – February 2, 1945) was an American National Guard officer who was killed in action during World War II. He was awarded the United States highest military decoration for valor, the Medal of Honor, posthumously. He was inducted to the Texas Military Hall of Honor in 1980, awarded the Texas Legislative Medal of Honor posthumously on May 31, 1999.

Biography
Knight was born in Garner, Texas. He graduated from Weatherford Junior College, in Weatherford, Texas, in 1938, and joined the Texas National Guard with his brother Curtis on November 18, 1940.

World War II
Knight served as a first lieutenant in the 124th Cavalry Regiment, Mars Task Force. On February 2, 1945, near LoiKang, Burma, Knight single-handedly destroyed two Japanese pillboxes. Despite being wounded, he led his rifle platoon in an attack on other enemy positions but was again wounded, this time fatally. For his heroic actions, he was awarded the Medal of Honor posthumously four months later, on June 25, 1945.

Knight, aged 27 at his death, was buried at the Holders Chapel Cemetery in Cool, Texas.

Medal of Honor

Medal of Honor citation
First Lieutenant Knight's official Medal of Honor citation reads:
He led his cavalry troop against heavy concentrations of enemy mortar, artillery, and small arms fire. After taking the troop's objective and while making preparations for a defense, he discovered a nest of Japanese pillboxes and foxholes to the right front. Preceding his men by at least 10 feet, he immediately led an attack. Single-handedly he knocked out 2 enemy pillboxes and killed the occupants of several foxholes. While attempting to knock out a third pillbox, he was struck and blinded by an enemy grenade. Although unable to see, he rallied his platoon and continued forward in the assault on the remaining pillboxes. Before the task was completed he fell mortally wounded. 1st Lt. Knight's gallantry and intrepidity were responsible for the successful elimination of most of the Japanese positions and served as an inspiration to officers and men of his troop.

Texas legislative Medal of Honor
He was awarded the Texas Legislative Medal of Honor in May 1999. The medal was given to sister who was to take it to his brother Curtis who also fought in the battle.

Building Dedication
Jack L Knight was honored with a building named after him at Weatherford College on November 11, 2014.

See also

List of Medal of Honor recipients
List of Medal of Honor recipients for World War II

External links

References

1917 births
1945 deaths
United States Army personnel killed in World War II
United States Army Medal of Honor recipients
Recipients of the Texas Legislative Medal of Honor
People from Parker County, Texas
United States Army officers
World War II recipients of the Medal of Honor
Military personnel from Texas